They Came to Rob Hong Kong (Chinese: 八寶奇兵) is a 1989 Hong Kong action comedy film produced and directed by Clarence Fok and starring Dean Shek, who also serves as the film's writer and executive producer. The film co-stars Chingmy Yau, Roy Cheung, Sandra Ng, Eric Tsang, Stanley Fung, Liu Wai-hung and Chin Siu-ho.

Plot
"Clarence Fok’s They Came to rob Hong Kong concerns a violent bank robber (Roy Cheung) who has to flee to the Mainland after being nearly caught by a tough cop (Kara Hui). There, he recruits a ragtag team of hapless morons (among which Eric Tsang, Stanley Fung, Sandra Ng, Dean Shek and Chin Siu Ho) to come back to Hong Kong and attempt a daring heist."

Mao Yiu-tung (Roy Cheung) is a Hong Kong criminal who escaped from a team of female cops, led by Shang (Kara Hui), to Mainland China. He recruits a team to go with him to Hong Kong to rob a bank. The team consists of two conmen doctors, Ken (Eric Tsang) and Yuen (Stanley Fung), a singer named Leslie Cheung (Liu Wai-hung), a dancer and martial artist named Bruce Hung (Chin Siu-ho), and two cops, Sherlock False (Dean Shek) and Monroe (Sandra Ng). The team are mentored by Jenny (Chingmy Yau), who teaches them about Hong Kong's society and geography.

Cast
 Dean Shek as Sherlock False
 Chingmy Yau as Jenny Tung
 Roy Cheung as Mao Yiu-tung
 Sandra Ng as Monroe
 Eric Tsang as Ken
 Stanley Fung as Yuen
 Liu Wai-hung as Leslie Cheung
 Chin Siu-ho as Bruce Hung
 Kara Hui as Superintendent Shang
 Charlie Cho  as Biggy
 Ann Bridgewater as police officer
 Yammie Lam as police officer
 Elaine Jin as Councillor Chu
 Shing Fui-On as Dean
 Wellson Chin as Sauna manager
 Ann Mui as Inspector May
 Chan King as Rooster
 Chan Fai-hung as police informer
 Yeung Hung as Tung's thug
 Lau Tin-yue
 Jameson Lam as Dean's thug
 Yeung Jing-jing as Mao's girl
 Michelle Sze-ma
 Cheung Choi-mei as Policewoman
 Law Shu-kei as False's superior
 Tin Kai-man as Rooster's thug

References

External links

They Came to Rob Hong Kong at Hong Kong Cinemagic

 They Came to Rob Hong Kong film review at LoveHKFilm.com

1989 films
1989 action comedy films
1980s martial arts comedy films
Hong Kong action comedy films
Hong Kong martial arts comedy films
1980s crime comedy films
Hong Kong heist films
Films directed by Clarence Fok
Films set in Hong Kong
Films shot in Hong Kong
1980s Hong Kong films